Marshall Brement (in New York City, in Tucson, Arizona) was a career United States Foreign Service officer who served as United States Ambassador to Iceland in 1981–1985 and, after retirement, was a professor at the University of Virginia.

Early life and education
Brement graduated from Brooklyn College with a Bachelor of Arts in 1952 and earned his Master of Arts at the University of Maryland in 1955. His foreign languages were Russian, Chinese (Mandarin and Cantonese), French, Spanish, Icelandic, and Indonesian. He was the first American Ambassador to publicly address the Icelandic people in their own language. Mr. Brement was married and had three children.

Foreign Service career
Brement entered the Foreign Service in 1956 as staff assistant in the Bureau of East Asian and Pacific Affairs. He attended Chinese language training in Taichung in 1958–1960, and was political officer in Hong Kong in 1960–1963. In 1963–1964, he attended Russian language training at the Foreign Service Institute. He was political officer in Moscow in 1964–1966. He attended the National Institute of Public Affairs at Stanford University in 1966–1967. He was chief of the political section in Singapore (1967–1970), counselor for public affairs in Jakarta, Indonesia in 1970–1973, counselor for public affairs in Saigon (1973–1974), counselor for political affairs in Moscow (1974–1976), and in Madrid, Spain (1977–1979). He later served on the National Security Council as a Soviet adviser to President Jimmy Carter and was a deputy to U.S. Ambassador Jeane Kirkpatrick at the United Nations before being appointed ambassador in Reykjavík in 1981.

After leaving Iceland, he spent four years at the United States Naval War College in Newport, Rhode Island, where he directed the Chief of Naval Operations Strategic Studies Group, an advisory think tank to the Chief of Naval Operations.

He served as distinguished visiting professor at the National Defense University and, from 1999 to 2002, he was an international affairs professor at the University of Virginia. He was fluent in French, Spanish, Hebrew, Russian, Chinese (Mandarin and Cantonese), Icelandic, and Indonesian.

Published works

References

1932 births
2009 deaths
Ambassadors of the United States to Iceland
Brooklyn College alumni
Naval War College faculty
People from New York City
Stanford University alumni
United States Foreign Service personnel
University of Maryland, College Park alumni
University of Virginia faculty